Sansom is a surname. Notable people with the surname include:

Allison Sansom (born 1994), Thai model
Ann Sansom, English poet
Art Sansom (1920–1991), American cartoonist
Arthur Ernest Sansom (1838–1907), English medical doctor
C. J. Sansom (born 1952), British writer
Chip Sansom, American comic strip cartoonist
Clive Sansom (1910–1981), British-born Tasmanian poet and playwright
Emma Sansom (1847–1900), American Civil War person
Ernest William Sansom (1890–1982), Canadian general
Gareth Sansom (born 1939), Australian artist
George Bailey Sansom (1883–1965), British historian
Henrietta Consuelo Sansom, Countess of Quigini Puliga (1847-1938), French writer
Ian Sansom (born 1966), English writer
Ivan Sansom, British palaeontologist
Ken Sansom (1927–2012), American actor and voice actor
Kenny Sansom (born 1958), English footballer
Odette Sansom, (1912-1995), Special Operations Executive agent, World War II
Peter Sansom (born 1958), English poet
Philip Sansom (1916–1999), British writer and anarchist
Ray Sansom (born 1962), American politician
Rosa Olga Sansom (1900–1989), New Zealand educator, botanist and writer
William Sansom (1763–1840), Philadelphia developer of Jewelers'_Row and namesake of Sansom Street
William Sansom (1912–1976), English writer